The 1st of Sonny Curtis is a country pop album by the Crickets guitarist and songwriter Sonny Curtis recorded for Viva Records. It is Curtis's first album for Viva and second solo record, after an LP of Flamenco versions of Beatles songs he released in 1964.  In addition to new original material, the album contains new versions of Sonny Curtis songs "A Fool Never Learns", "Walk Right Back", and "I Fought The Law (And The Law Won)". The album was originally released as a stereo LP record in late February 1968, the album has never been re-released on CD.  There was no mono release.<ref name="undefined"

Track listing

Personnel 
 Sonny Curtis - guitar, vocals
 Glen D. Hardin - piano
 Snuff Garrett - arranger
 Leon Russell - arranger
 Recorded Amigo Studios

Cover versions 

A number of artists have recorded versions of songs on the album, including: 
 "I Wanna Go Bummin' Around" by Michael Shelley
 "Day Drinker" by Johnny Duncan

References

External links

1968 albums
The Crickets albums
albums produced by Snuff Garrett
Viva Records albums